Don't Get Personal (1922 film), a film directed by Clarence G. Badger
 Don't Get Personal (1936 film), a film directed by William Nigh
 Don't Get Personal (1942 film), a film directed by Charles Lamont